Colton is a civil parish in the district of Lichfield, Staffordshire, England.  It contains 13 buildings that are recorded in the National Heritage List for England.  Of these, two are listed at Grade II*, the middle of the three grades, and the others are at Grade II, the lowest grade.  The parish contains the village of Colton and the surrounding countryside.  Most of the listed buildings are houses and associated structures, farmhouses and farm buildings.  The other listed buildings are a church, the ruins of two previous houses, and a bridge.


Key

Buildings

References

Citations

Sources

Lists of listed buildings in Staffordshire